Agra is a village and former municipality in the canton of Ticino, Switzerland.

In 2004 the municipality was merged with the other, neighboring municipalities Gentilino and Montagnola to form a new and larger municipality Collina d'Oro.

History
The hamlet of Bigogno, which is part of Agra, is first mentioned in 1270 in an inventory of the lands of the monastery of S. Abbondio in Como in the Valle di Lugano.  The inventory of Como Cathedral (1298) mentions their allodial titles and episcopal loans in Agra as well as possessions of the Disentis Abbey.  The same document also mentions the church of S. Tommaso in Agra.  The church initially belonged to the parish of S. Pietro in Pambio and then became an under-parish in 1591.  The Chapel of S. Assunta in Bigogno was completed before 1609.  In the statutes of Como from 1335, the Concilium or Vicinanza of Agra and Premona or Barbengo is first mentioned.

In addition to agriculture, the village was once famous for training and sending artisans to Russia along with other European nations.  In 1912 a regional sanatorium opened in the village.  It was a residence to for many, especially German-speaking, notables and intellectuals.  They published the monthly magazine Die Terrasse (The Terrace) from the sanatorium.  It was closed in 1969 and fell into disrepair.

Location

Historic population
The historical population is given in the following chart:

References

Former municipalities of Ticino
Villages in Ticino
Articles which contain graphical timelines